Mobergella is a millimetric Lower Cambrian shelly fossil of unknown affinity, usually preserved in phosphate and particularly well known from Swedish strata, where it is diagnostic of lowermost Cambrian rocks. Originally interpreted as a monoplacophoran, the circular, cap-shaped shell resembles a hyolith operculum, with concentric rings on its upper surface, and seven pairs of internal muscle scars. It is never found in association with a conch, and its affinity therefore remains undetermined. Nevertheless, its heavy musculature does seem to indicate that it functioned as an operculum.

Some specimens bear evidence of healed injuries.

It's also been compared to the Kirengellids, which are probably brachiopods.

Occurrence 
The genus is  unique to Lower Cambrian strata and has been found throughout the northern hemisphere.

References

Enigmatic prehistoric animal genera
Cambrian animals of Europe
Cambrian animals of Asia

Cambrian genus extinctions